Sri Vadiraja Teertharu (1480 – 1600) was a Dvaita philosopher, poet, traveller and mystic. A polymath of his time, he authored many works, often polemical, on Madhva theology and metaphysics. Additionally, he composed numerous poems and as the pontiff of Sodhe Mutt, renovated the temple complex at Udupi and established the Paryaya system of worship.  He is also credited with enriching the Kannada literature of the time by translating  Madhvacharya's works to Kannada, giving impetus and contributing to the Haridasa movement. He has influenced both Carnatic and Hindustani music through his compositions. His compositions are mainly in Kannada and Sanskrit. His mudra is 'Hayavadana'. His works are characterised by their poetic flourishes, incisive wit and humour.

Life
Vadirajaru was born as Bhuvaraha in Huvinakere, a village in the Kundapura taluk. He was ordained as a monk at the age of 8 and placed into the care of Vidyanidhi Tirtharu and later Vagisha Tirtharu , who oversaw his education.  Works of contemporary Haridasas and oral traditions point to Vadirajaru being a student of Vyasatirtharu along with Vijayendra Tirtharu though he never acknowledged Vyasatirtha as his mentor in his works. He eventually assumed the pontifical seat of the mutt at Sodhe, succeeding Vagisha Tirtha. Vadiraja seems to have wielded some influence in the court of the Nayakas of Keladi as Vadiraja's successor, Vedavedya Tirtha, received grants of villages from Keladi Venkatappa Nayak.  In 1512, Vadiraja began his grand tour of the pilgrimages in India lasting for two decades, the details of which he recorded in his travelogue entitled Tirtha Prabanda. A number of miracles have been ascribed to him during these journeys such as resurrection of the dead and exorcism of demons.  Traditional accounts also speak of his expertise in occult and especially of an incident involving the taming of a forest spirit called Annappa or Bhutaraja.  Vadiraja is known to have debated the Jain scholars at Moodabidri and Karkala and converted a sect of Brahmins of the goldsmith community to the Dvaita fold.They are identified as Daivajnya Brahmins.  It was around the same time that he restructured the organisation of the temple at Udupi, established the Ashta Mathas around the temple and renovated the temple itself. The ecclesiastical and liturgical reforms initiated by him survive to this day.
A life of 120 years is traditionally ascribed to him. Though the veracity of this claim may be questioned, Sharma notes "there is no doubt he (Vadiraja) enjoyed a long life presiding over the mutt at Sodhe, established by him, for a number of years". His mortal remains (Brindavana) are enshrined at Sodhe.

Legacy
Vadiraja gave impetus and contributed to Dasa Sahitya, writing several poems under the ankita naama  Hayavadana. Yuktimalika is widely considered to be his magnum opus. Sharma notes "The work is brimming with freshness and originality of approach and ideas".  He also composed several poems, notable of which is an epic poem of 19 cantos titled Rukminisha Vijaya.

Notable Works
A prolific writer, Vadiraja is credited with more than sixty works.  His oeuvre is diverse, ranging from short hymns and epic poems to abstract scholarly works on the metaphysical intricacies of Dvaita. Many of his independent works are polemical barbs directed not only at Advaita but heterodox schools like Buddhism and especially Jainism which flourished in the South Canara region in the 16th century.

List of scholarly works

List of literary works

Notes

References

Bibliography

External links
 Vadiraja Tirtha

16th-century Hindu religious leaders
Hindu revivalists
Dvaitin philosophers
History of Karnataka
Kannada literature
Madhva religious leaders
People from Udupi district
Dvaita Vedanta
Tulu people
16th-century Indian scholars
Madhva Brahmins
Vijayanagara poets
Scholars of Vijayanagara Empire
15th-century Indian philosophers